Sar Giz (also Romanized as Sar Gīz; also known as Sar Gīs, Sarkīs, and Sarkīz) is a village in Oshnavieh-ye Jonubi Rural District, Nalus District, Oshnavieh County, West Azerbaijan Province, Iran. At the 2006 census, its population was 448, in 75 families.

References 

Populated places in Oshnavieh County